"Shine" is the tenth single by Japanese rock band Luna Sea, released on June 3, 1998. It was the band's fifth number 1 on the Oricon Singles Chart, and charted for eight weeks. In June 1998, it was certified Platinum by the RIAJ for sales over 400,000.

"Shine" was used in a Toyota commercial. The song was covered by amber gris on the compilation Crush! 2 -90's V-Rock Best Hit Cover Songs-, which was released on November 23, 2011 and features current visual kei bands covering songs from bands that were important to the 1990s visual kei movement.

Track listing
All songs written and composed by Luna Sea.

"Shine" - 4:43Originally composed by J.
"Looper" - 4:07The title came from the fact that the bass and drums are repeated in loop. The fast spoken English words in the background are performed by Sugizo.

References

Luna Sea songs
Oricon Weekly number-one singles
1998 singles